Zhang Lan (born October 18, 1990) is a female wrestler from China.

External links
 https://www.youtube.com/watch?v=lPzzUqVID84

Living people
1990 births
Chinese female sport wrestlers
Asian Games medalists in wrestling
Wrestlers at the 2010 Asian Games
World Wrestling Championships medalists
Medalists at the 2010 Asian Games
Asian Games silver medalists for China
21st-century Chinese women